Kelvin Kirkwood Keech (June 28, 1895 – May 22, 1977) was an American actor, producer and old-time radio announcer.

Keech was known for being the announcer for several popular old-time radio programs including The Eveready Hour, Bill and Betty, Popeye the Sailor and Terry and the Pirates.

Keech was also known for remaking and redistributing the banjolele with his brother Austin Britton in 1917.

Early life
Kelvin Kirkwood Keech was born on June 28, 1895 in Honolulu, Republic of Hawaii to parents Alvin Welty Keech and Isabella Keech (née Weir). He had an elder brother Alvin Danglada Keech (1890 - May 22, 1948) who was also an expert banjo player. Kelvin Keech went to and graduated from Franklin & Marshall College in Lancaster, Pennsylvania before concluding his studies in Boston.

Career

The Keech Studios
In 1915, the Keech brothers founded The Keech Studios which was located at 435 Powell Street in San Francisco, California. The studio was responsible for the signing of employees to the Hawaiian company Matson, Inc., organizing concerts in California, tours in the Midwest and even manufacture.

World War I career and Europe
Keech served in the United States Army Signal Corps during World War I. Keech was a radio engineer in France. Keech was wounded in action in September 1918 and while recovering at the American Hospital in Neuilly-sur-Seine, France, Keech met Bill Henley and after Keech was discharged from the hospital, the two formed a jazz orchestra band entitled "The White Lyres". The group traveled throughout various parts of France and neighboring countries.

In April 1919, Keech moved to Paris where he showed off his banjo playing skills. The White Lyres performed at the Savoy Dancing Club and had a two-month engagement at the London branch of the Ciro's nightclub from October–December 1919. While in London in the 1920s, Keech befriended the at that time Prince of Wales Edward Windsor and even taught him to play the ukulele.

The Banjolele
In 1916, San Francisco resident John A. Bolander patented the first banjolele. The banjolele was a four-stringed musical instrument with a small banjo-type body and  also had a fretted ukulele neck. In 1922 after Alvin joined Keech in Paris, the brothers distributed, made and sold several variations of what would become known as Keech Banjoleles. The instrument was very popular in Europe, specifically France, Italy and England, and even were sold in parts of Hawaii and Dallas. The Keech brothers along with their studios ceased manufacturing the banjoleles in 1939. The instrument itself has sharply declined in popularity however, several manufacturing companies in the United States that make the banjolele still exist.

Radio
Keech's career in radio began in the mid-1920s on 2LO, a syndicate of the British Broadcasting Company. Keech was a performer on various programs of the station. Keech could usually be found playing either the ukulele or the banjo when he performed on radio. He performed on 2LO for several years before he moved back to the United States in 1928. After announcing roles on several radio programs, he earned an audition for the NBC affiliate WEAF in New York. Despite numerous roles on the radio, Keech caught a case of mike fright. However, a second audition several weeks later earned Keech a spot on NBC's board of announcers.

Keech was most noted for announcing The Eveready Hour, Bill and Betty, Popeye the Sailor and Terry and the Pirates all on NBC during the 1920s, 1930s and 1940s.

Personal life
In the historic city of Constantinople, Keech met his future wife Marie. Marie was born in Russia in 1896 and did not understand a word of English and at the same time Keech did not know a word of Russian. The two fell in love and were married. The two had no children.

Keech died on May 22, 1977 in Jackson Heights, Queens, New York at the age of 81. Keech is buried with his wife in Roslyn Cemetery in Roslyn, New York. Marie preceded Kelvin in death by 4 years.

Filmography

Radio
The Eveready Hour
Fuller Brush Man
Fireside Recitals
Twenty Thousand Years in Sing Sing
Heart Throbs of the Hills 
Bill and Betty   
Popeye the Sailor
Terry and the Pirates

Film
Alvin and Kelvin Keech (1926) himself; short film made in Phonofilm sound-on-film process
Stephen Foster (1933) announcer
On the Air and Off (1933) himself; short film

Bibliography
A Standard Method and Self-instructor on the Ukulele (1914)
The Keech Banjulele and Ukulele Tutor by the Keech Brothers with Alvin D. Keech (1922)

Further reading
 Buxton, Frank and Owen, Bill, Big Broadcast 1920-1950, The, Second Edition, Scarecrow Press, 1997
 Delong, Thomas A., Radio Stars: An Illustrated Biographical Dictionary Of 953 Performers 1920-1960, McFarland and Company, Inc., 1996
 Poindexter, Ray, Golden Throats and Silver Tongues - The Radio Announcers, River Road Press, 1978
 Terrace, Vincent, Radio's Golden Years - The Encyclopedia of Radio Programs 1930-1960, A. S. Barnes and Company

References

External links

1895 births
1977 deaths